Pinball London is a film production company based in London, England. 
The company works with auteur filmmakers including Emir Kusturica, Sally Potter, Guillermo Arriaga and Jim Jarmusch. Pinball was founded by producer Paula Vaccaro in 2009 and is often involved in international co-production. In 2011 the company released The Silver Goat directed by Aaron Brookner, the first film produced for iPad exhibition.

Filmography

References

External links
 Company Website

Film production companies of the United Kingdom
Mass media in London
Mass media companies established in 2009